The 19th Actors and Actresses Union Awards ceremony was held on 29 March 2010 at the Teatro Circo Price in Madrid.

In addition to the competitive awards Sahrawi activist Amainetu Haidar received the '' award, Aurora Bautista the '' career award and the Special Award went to the Instituto Cervantes.

Winners and nominees 
The winners and nominees are listed as follows:

Film

Television

Theatre

Newcomers

References 

Actors and Actresses Union Awards
2010 in Madrid
2010 television awards
2010 film awards
2010 theatre awards
March 2010 events in Europe